Giannis Charontakis (born 7 August 1995) is a Greek professional footballer who plays as a left-back.

Career
Charontakis started his professional career in Ajax Tavros during 2010–11 football season. The following season, he moved on a free transfer to Ethnikos Asteras in Football League where he played in 10 matches. He later moved on to Kallithea again on a free transfer where he played just one time. In summer transfer window of 2014, Charontakis signed a contract with Superleague Greece side Panionios but he failed to make an appearance for the club. During winter transfer windows of 2015, he moved on a free transfer to Alimos where he played 3 times. In July 2015, he moved to Trikala on a free transfer and made 14 appearances for the club.

On 25 June 2016, Charontakis signed a two-year-contract with Greek Superleague side Veria. 

On 13 February 2017 he signed with Serbian club Vojvodina. However, just 10 days later, he terminated his contract and left the club.

On 10 January 2018 he signed with Ligue 2 club AC Ajaccio.

References

1995 births
Living people
Footballers from Athens
Greek footballers
Association football midfielders
Super League Greece players
Veria F.C. players
FK Vojvodina players
Expatriate footballers in Serbia
Trikala F.C. players